Yaron is a Hebrew name meaning "is full of joy", "will be full of joy", or "to shout, to sing". It is common in Israel as both a male first name and a surname. Its English-language equivalent is "Jaron".

Notable people with the first name Yaron include:
 Yaron Brook, executive director of the Ayn Rand Institute
 Yaron Brown, Israeli soccer player
 Yaron Golan, Israeli publisher
 Yaron Herman, Israeli-French jazz pianist
 Yaron Kohlberg, Israeli classical pianist
 Yaron Lifschitz, Australian theatre director
 Yaron London, Israeli media personality
 Yaron Margolin, Israeli dancer and choreographer
 Yaron Matras, British linguist
 Yaron Svoray, Israeli author and investigative journalist
 Yaron Traub
 Yaron Zilberman, director of the documentary Watermarks
 Yarone Zober, Israeli-American politician and acting mayor, for a time, of Pittsburgh, Pennsylvania

Notable people with the surname Yaron include:

 Amos Yaron, Israeli general accused of complicity in the Sabra and Shatila massacre
 Hagit Messer Yaron (born 1953), Israeli electrical engineer, businesswoman, and  President of Open University of Israel
 Ido Yaron, Israeli DJ and founder of Utopia Records
 Miriam Yaron, Miss Israel 1950

Notable people with the first name Jaron include:
 Jaron Lanier, virtual reality pioneer
 Jaron Lowenstein, one half of the duo Evan and Jaron
 Jaron Varsano, Israeli husband of actress Gal Gadot

See also 
 Jaron
 Jerome

References 

Hebrew words and phrases
Hebrew-language surnames
Jewish surnames
Jewish masculine given names
Hebrew masculine given names